Big Lagoon is a census-designated place in Humboldt County, California. Its population is 161 as of the 2020 census, up from 93 from the 2010 census.

Education
Big Lagoon is the seat of the Big Lagoon Union Elementary School District, and home of the Big Lagoon School, a public K-8 school built in 1956 and renovated in 1996.

Demographics

The 2010 United States Census reported that Big Lagoon had a population of 93. The racial makeup of Big Lagoon was 73 (78.5%) White, 0 (0.0%) African American, 11 (11.8%) Native American, 0 (0.0%) Asian, 0 (0.0%) Pacific Islander, 1 (1.1%) from other races, and 8 (8.6%) from two or more races. Hispanic or Latino of any race were 11 persons (11.8%).

The Census reported that 93 people (100% of the population) lived in households, 0 (0%) lived in non-institutionalized group quarters, and 0 (0%) were institutionalized.

There were 53 households, out of which 4 (7.5%) had children under the age of 18 living in them, 18 (34.0%) were opposite-sex married couples living together, 3 (5.7%) had a female householder with no husband present, 1 (1.9%) had a male householder with no wife present.  There were 3 (5.7%) unmarried opposite-sex partnerships, and 0 (0%) same-sex married couples or partnerships. 27 households (50.9%) were made up of individuals, and 10 (18.9%) had someone living alone who was 65 years of age or older. The average household size was 1.75.  There were 22 families (41.5% of all households); the average family size was 2.64.

The population was spread out, with 12 people (12.9%) under the age of 18, 1 people (1.1%) aged 18 to 24, 19 people (20.4%) aged 25 to 44, 36 people (38.7%) aged 45 to 64, and 25 people (26.9%) who were 65 years of age or older.  The median age was 56.3 years. For every 100 females, there were 72.2 males.  For every 100 females age 18 and over, there were 80.0 males.

The homeowner vacancy rate was 0%; the rental vacancy rate was 0%.  66 people (71.0% of the population) lived in owner-occupied housing units and 27 people (29.0%) lived in rental housing units.

Government

References

Census-designated places in Humboldt County, California
Census-designated places in California
Populated coastal places in California